Tetri Giorgi may refer to:
Tetri Giorgi, one of the identities of St. George in Georgia
Tetri Giorgi (organization), several organizations named after the saint